Outeniqua Park is a multi-purpose stadium in George, South Africa.  It is currently used mostly for rugby union matches and was the home stadium of the South African leg of the IRB Sevens World Series from 2001 through 2010, after which it moved to Nelson Mandela Bay Stadium in Port Elizabeth.

The stadium is also the home of the SWD Eagles rugby team who compete in the Currie Cup. The stadium is able to hold 7,500 people.

See also

List of rugby league stadiums by capacity
List of rugby union stadiums by capacity

References

External links
Worldstadiums

Rugby union stadiums in South Africa
Multi-purpose stadiums in South Africa
Sports venues in the Western Cape
World Rugby Sevens Series venues